Lippe State Library (Lippische Landesbibliothek Detmold) is the universal and regional library for Ostwestfalen-Lippe in Germany. It is based at Detmold.

External links 
Official website
Entry on the Handbuch der historischen Buchbestände in Deutschland

Buildings and structures in Lippe
Libraries in Germany
Detmold